Alexander Buchmann (born January 24, 1982) is a former Norwegian handball player.

Biography
His last club was US d'Ivry Handball in the French First League of Handball. He has also played for the Norwegian clubs Astor, Byåsen, Sjetne and Heimdal, German club SG Flensburg-Handewitt, Spanish club BM Altea and Toulouse Union Handball in France.

He played 61 matches and scored 196 goals for the Norwegian Team before he had to quit handball due to an Achilles tendon injury during the world championship in 2009.

After he retired as a handball player he has been working with the Norwegian Handball Federation doing analysis.

Since autumn 2010 he has been working with logistics at Médecins Sans Frontières...

References

http://www.adressa.no/nyheter/utenriks/article1538138.ece

External links
 Profil på handball.no
 
 
 https://web.archive.org/web/20160303191049/http://www.legerutengrenser.no/Aktuelt/Feltarbeidere/Alexander-Buchmann

1982 births
Living people
Norwegian male handball players
Liga ASOBAL players
Sportspeople from Trondheim